The Tubal Furnace Archeological Site is the site of an early 18th century industrial iron works in Spotsylvania County, Virginia, near Chancellor.  Established by colonial Lieutenant Governor Alexander Spotswood in c. 1717, the site included a furnace and waterworks.  It was operated, primarily by skilled slave labor, into the early 19th century.

The site was listed on the National Register of Historic Places in 1982.

See also
National Register of Historic Places listings in Spotsylvania County, Virginia

References

Industrial buildings completed in 1717
Archaeological sites on the National Register of Historic Places in Virginia
Spotsylvania County, Virginia
Industrial buildings and structures on the National Register of Historic Places in Virginia
National Register of Historic Places in Spotsylvania County, Virginia
1717 establishments in the Thirteen Colonies